Mouette is a French word for seagull (cognate to mew). It can refer to:
 La Mouette, French aircraft manufacturer
 , French automobile company in the 1920s
 Operation Mouette, 1953 French military operation in Vietnam
 The name given to the Stadler FLIRT train sets for SBB Switzerland

See also
 Mouettes, commune in Eure, Haute-Normandie
 Mouettes Genevoises Navigation, Swiss transport organization